Okey Ogunjiofor is a Nigerian Nollywood producer and actor known for co-pioneering the Nigeria movie industry with his film Living in Bondage in 1992. In 2022, his film Amina won the 2022 AMVCA for Best overall movie award category and became the first Nigerian film to be named on a global top ten Netflix list.

References

External links

Living people
Year of birth missing (living people)
Nigerian film directors
Nigerian film producers
Nigerian male actors
21st-century Nigerian male actors